Thomas Ball (June 3, 1819 – December 11, 1911) was an American sculptor and musician.  His work has had a marked influence on monumental art in the United States, especially in New England.

Life
He was born in Charlestown, Massachusetts, to Thomas Ball, a house and sign painter and Elizabeth Wyer Hall. His father died when he was twelve. After several odd jobs to help support his family he spent three years working at the New England Museum, the precursor to the Boston Museum. There he entertained the visitors by drawing portraits, playing the violin, and singing, and repaired mechanical toys. He then became an apprentice for the museum wood-carver Abel Brown. He taught himself oil painting by copying prints and casts in the studio of the museum superintendent.

Sculptor
His earliest work was a bust of Jenny Lind, whom he saw on her 1850 tour of the United States. Copies of his Lind work and his bust of Daniel Webster sold widely before being widely copied by others. His work includes many early cabinet busts of musicians. His first statue of a figure was a two-foot high statue of Daniel Webster, on which he worked from photographs and engravings until he managed to see him pass his studio shortly before his death.

Musician
Ball was an accomplished musician and from his teenage years working as a paid singer in Boston churches. He performed as an unpaid soloist with the Handel and Haydn Society beginning in 1846 and with that organization sang the title role in the first United States performance of Mendelssohn's Elijah, and the baritone solos in Rossini's Moses in Egypt. On a visit to Boston years later he performed the baritone role in Boston's first performance of Beethoven's Ninth Symphony with the Germania Orchestra on April 2, 1853.

Painter

As commissions started to come in he moved from studio to studio until he settled in a studio in Tremont Row where he remained for twelve years. There he painted several religious pictures and a portrait of Cornelia Wells (Walter) Richards, editor of the Boston Evening Transcript. He then turned his attention to sculpture.

At thirty-five he went to Florence for study. Except for an interval of work in Boston, Massachusetts, in 1857–1865, he remained there until 1897 as a member of an artistic colony that included Robert and Elizabeth Barrett Browning and Hiram Powers. The notables he met in Europe included Franz Liszt, whom he met at the Vatican in 1865 and of whom he produced a portrait bust.

He made it a practice never to attend the unveiling of any of his public works. Once in Boston, he managed to avoid receiving the invitation to the ceremonial dedication of his statue of Gov. Andrew and instead went to see the work later, viewing it from different approaches. He later wrote: "It was a mean thing to do. I am ashamed of it now, but I could not bring myself to stand on that platform and face the multitude."

Dartmouth College awarded him an honorary degree of Master of Arts.

When he returned to America he lived in Montclair, New Jersey, while keeping a studio in New York City.

In 1880, Ball published an autobiographical volume, My Threescore Years, which he updated in 1890 as My Three Score Years and Ten.

Ball died at the Montclair home of his daughter, Eliza Chickering Ball, and son-in-law, sculptor William Couper.

Selected works

Bust of Jenny Lind (plaster, 1851), New York Historical Society, New York City.
Bust of Daniel Webster (bronze), Hood Museum of Art, Dartmouth College, Hanover, New Hampshire.
Statuette of Daniel Webster (bronze, 1853).
Four bas-relief panels (bronze, 1856), on base of Richard Saltonstall Greenough's Benjamin Franklin statue, Old City Hall, Boston, Massachusetts.
Statuette of Henry Clay (bronze, 1858), U.S. Senate Art Collection, U.S. Capitol, Washington, D.C.
Daniel Webster (bronze, 1860–1868), Central Park, New York City.
Equestrian Statue of George Washington (bronze, 1864), Boston Public Garden, Boston, Massachusetts.
The model for this statue is held by the Boston Athenaeum
Bust of Edward Everett (marble, 1867), Boston Public Library, Boston, Massachusetts.
Edwin Forrest as "Coriolanus" (marble, 1867), Walnut Street Theater, Philadelphia, Pennsylvania.
Josiah Quincy (bronze, 1869), Old City Hall, Boston, Massachusetts.
John Albion Andrew (marble, 1870), Doric Hall, Massachusetts State House, Boston, Massachusetts.
"The Angel of Death Lifting the Veil from the Eyes of Faith" (Jonas Chickering Monument) (marble, 1872), Mount Auburn Cemetery, Cambridge, Massachusetts.
Saint John the Evangelist (marble, 1875), Forest Hills Cemetery, Boston, Massachusetts. Replaced by a polymer replica, 2001.
Copies of this are in the Smithsonian American Art Museum, Washington, D.C.; the Chrysler Museum of Art, Norfolk, Virginia; and the Montclair Art Museum, Montclair, New Jersey.
Emancipation Memorial (bronze, 1875), Lincoln Park, Washington, D.C.
A copy of this was in Park Square, Boston, Massachusetts.
Charles Sumner (bronze, 1878), Boston Public Garden, Boston, Massachusetts.
Daniel Webster (bronze, 1885–86), New Hampshire State House, Concord, New Hampshire. The commission was first given to sculptor Martin Milmore, then to his brother. Ball took it over following the deaths of both Milmores. This has a different pose from his earlier Webster statues.
P. T. Barnum (bronze, 1887), Seaside Park, Bridgeport, Connecticut.

Washington Monument
George Washington Monument (1883–1893), Methuen, Massachusetts. This was Ball's most complex and ambitious work, consisting of a 15-foot bronze statue of Washington, 4 larger-than-life seated figures, 4 portrait busts, and 4 eagles flanked by flags, all displayed on a multi-tiered marble base. The monument was created at Ball's studio in Florence, Italy. His son-in-law, William Couper, assisted in modeling the figures. It was exhibited at the 1893 World Columbian Exposition in Chicago, Illinois, before being installed in Methuen, Massachusetts and dedicated on February 22, 1900.
George Washington
Cincinnatus (seated figure of Washington)
Revolution (seated figure)
Oppression (seated figure)
Victory (seated figure)
Bust of the Marquis de LaFayette
Bust of General Henry Knox
Bust of General Nathaniel Greene
Bust of General Benjamin Lincoln
Four sets of Eagles and Flags
The monument was sold in 1958, disassembled, and moved to Forest Lawn Memorial Park, Hollywood Hills, California.

Gallery

References

Attribution

Sources

 Taft, History of American Sculpture (New York, 1903)
 Nash, Edwin G., "Ball, Thomas" in Dictionary of American Biography, vol. 1 (NY: Charles Scribner's Sons, 1928)
 Thomas Ball, My Threescore Years And Ten: An Autobiography (Boston: Roberts Brothers, 1891)
 Thomas Ball,  My Fourscore Years (Los Angeles: Trecavalli Press, 1993)
 http://www.wingedsun.com/books/ball.htm

External links
Thomas Ball at Smithsonian Institution Research Information System.

1819 births
1911 deaths
Artists from Boston
19th-century American male opera singers
People from Montclair, New Jersey
American expatriates in Italy
Sculptors from New Jersey
American operatic baritones
Musicians from Boston
19th-century American sculptors
19th-century American male artists
American male sculptors
20th-century American sculptors
20th-century American male artists
Sculptors from Massachusetts
Classical musicians from Massachusetts
Artists of the Boston Public Library
Singers from New Jersey
Classical musicians from New Jersey